Bắc Ninh is a city in the northern part of Vietnam and is the capital of Bắc Ninh province. The city is the cultural, administrative and commercial center of the province. The city area is 82.60 square km, with a population of 501,199 in November 2017. In January 2006, the town (thị xã) of Bắc Ninh was upgraded to city (thành phố).

History
In March 1884, Bắc Ninh was the site of a decisive campaign in the wars between France and assorted Black Flag Army forces, and the town fell to the French. Thereafter under French protectorate, the town was confirmed as the center of all political, economic, cultural offices of colonial administration in the province. The land of the Bắc Ninh Citadel, within Yên, Niem and Do Villages, was occupied by French troops. At this time Bắc Ninh became known in Europe for its lacquer work and mother-of-pearl inlaid black-wood screens, cabinets, trays, and boxes. Bắc Ninh Railway Station opened after 1904. An ambush of French troops by the Việt Minh occurred at Bắc Ninh while the 1946 Fontainebleau Conference was ongoing.

The city's name means "northern serenity".

Buildings
The city is home to the Banking Academy of Vietnam, Bắc Ninh campus (Học viện Ngân hàng), the Kinh Bắc International School, and the Military Academy of Politics main campus (Học viện Chính trị Quân sự), and Bắc Ninh Railway Station. There is a shrine to Bà Chúa Kho.

Administrative subdivisions 
The city is administratively divided into 19 units, including 19 urban wards (phường) - Đáp Cầu, Hạp Lĩnh, Khắc Niệm, Phong Khê, Khúc Xuyên, Thị Cầu, Vũ Ninh, Suối Hoa, Tiền An, Ninh Xá, Vân Dương, Vạn An, Vệ An, Kinh Bắc, Đại Phúc, Võ Cường, Hoà Long, Kim Chân and Nam Sơn.

Gallery

References

Provincial capitals in Vietnam
Populated places in Bắc Ninh province
Districts of Bắc Ninh province
Cities in Vietnam